The 2016 Brunei Super League (also known as the DST Super League for sponsorship reasons) was the 4th season of the Brunei Super League, the top Bruneian professional league for association football clubs, since its establishment in 2012. The season began on 12 March 2016 and concluded on 30 September 2016.

MS ABDB came into the season as defending champions of the 2015 season. Kota Ranger and Kasuka entered as the two promoted teams from the Premier League. NFABD concluded the league after only one round, which meant that MS ABDB retained the title with seven wins out of nine.

Teams 
A total of 10 teams participated in the 2016 Super League season, eight from the previous season and two promoted teams. Kota Ranger were promoted as champions of the country's second tier while Kasuka were also promoted, that's despite finishing outside the top two places in third but as Tabuan Muda B (Brunei U18s) finished second and are ineligible for promotion, it was awarded to Kasuka instead. Kota Ranger and Kasuka replaced IKLS and Kilanas who were relegated in 2015.

Stadia
Note: Table lists in alphabetical order.

Personnel and kits

Managerial changes

Results

League table

Results

Matchday 1

Matchday 2

Matchday 3

Matchday 4

Matchday 5

Matchday 6

Matchday 7

Matchday 8

Matchday 9

Notes

References

External links 
Soccerway
RSSSF
National Football Association of Brunei Darussalam website 

Brunei Super League seasons
Brunei
Brunei